Jean Hamon may refer to:
Jean Hamon (doctor) (1618–1687), French doctor
Jean Hamon (philanthropist), French millionaire real estate dealer and arts patron